Marquess of Abergavenny (pronounced Abergenny) in the County of Monmouth, is a title in the Peerage of the United Kingdom created on 14 January 1876, along with the title Earl of Lewes (pronounced "Lewis"), in the County of Sussex, for the 5th Earl of Abergavenny, a member of the Nevill family.

The 6th and present Marquess is Christopher George Charles Nevill (b. 23 April 1955), son of Lord Rupert Nevill and Lady Anne Camilla Evelyn Wallop. He succeeded to the title in 2000 on the death of his uncle the 5th Marquess, who had no surviving sons.

The family seat is Eridge Park, near Royal Tunbridge Wells, Kent.

History

Medieval Origins
The incumbent Marquess of Abergavenny is the current head of the House of Neville, a noble house of early medieval origins, notable for its central role in the Wars of the Roses. Lord Abergavenny's ancestor Edward Neville, 3rd Baron Bergavenny was a younger son of Ralph Neville, 1st Earl of Westmorland and Lady Joan Beaufort, daughter of John of Gaunt 1st Duke of Lancaster. Abergavenny in the Marquess's title derives from the market town in Wales in which this branch of the Nevill family inherited Abergavenny Castle, much of the family's ancestral lands and title of Baron Bergavenny by virtue of the marriage between the suo jure peeress Elizabeth de Beauchamp, Baroness Bergavenny and Edward Neville in 1424.

Subsidiary Titles
Subsequent Nevill Barons Bergavenny have been raised to higher ranks within the peerage. The 1st Marquess's ancestor, the de facto 17th (de jure 2nd) Baron Bergavenny, was created Earl of Abergavenny, in the County of Monmouth, and Viscount Nevill, of Birling in the County of Kent, in the Peerage of Great Britain on 17 May 1784. The Barony of Bergavenny was held by his successors, the Earls and Marquesses of Abergavenny, until 1938, when it passed into abeyance between the two daughters of the 3rd Marquess. The 5th Earl of Abergavenny was elevated to the title of Marquess of Abergavenny along with the subsidiary title of Earl of Lewes on 14 January 1876, following his role in the foundation of the modern day Conservative Party with Disraeli and Lord Salisbury.

Coat of arms
The heraldic blazon for the coat of arms of the Marquesses of Abergavenny is: Gules, a saltire argent charged with a rose of the field (barbed and seeded proper). These are the ancient arms of Neville differenced by a rose, the symbol of a 7th son, in reference to Sir Edward Neville, 1st Baron Bergavenny (d.1476), 7th son of Ralph Neville, 1st Earl of Westmorland. The blazon can be translated as "On a red background, a white saltire with a red rose, naturally coloured, upon it."

Earls of Abergavenny (1784)
Other titles (1st Earl onwards): Viscount Nevill (GB 1784), Baron Bergavenny (GB 1724) 
George Nevill, 1st Earl of Abergavenny (1727–1785)
Henry Nevill, 2nd Earl of Abergavenny (1755–1843)
Henry George Nevill, Viscount Nevill, (1785–1806)
Ralph Nevill, Viscount Nevill (1786–1826)
John Nevill, 3rd Earl of Abergavenny (1789–1845)
William Nevill, 4th Earl of Abergavenny (1792–1868)
William Nevill, 5th Earl of Abergavenny (1826–1915) (created Marquess of Abergavenny in 1876)

Marquesses of Abergavenny (1876)
Other titles (1st Marquess onwards): Viscount Nevill (GB 1784), Earl of Lewes (UK 1876)Other titles (1st-3rd Marquesses): Baron Bergavenny (GB 1724, abeyant 1938)  
William Nevill, 1st Marquess of Abergavenny (1826–1915)
Reginald William Bransby Nevill, 2nd Marquess of Abergavenny (1853–1927)
Henry Gilbert Ralph Nevill, 3rd Marquess of Abergavenny (1854–1938)
Gilbert Reginald Nevill (1879–1891)
Guy Temple Montacute Larnach-Nevill, 4th Marquess of Abergavenny (1883–1954)
Lord Rupert Nevill (1923-1982)
John Henry Guy Nevill, 5th Marquess of Abergavenny (1914–2000)
Henry John Montague Nevill, Earl of Lewes (1948–1965)
Christopher Nevill, 6th Marquess of Abergavenny (born 1955)

There are no heirs to the marquessate; the heir presumptive to the earldom is the present marquess's third cousin, David Michael Ralph Nevill (b. 1941)

 William Nevill, 4th Earl of Abergavenny (1792–1868) William Nevill, 1st Marquess of Abergavenny (1826–1915)Lord George Montacute Nevill (1856–1920) Guy Larnach-Nevill, 4th Marquess of Abergavenny (1883–1954)Lord Rupert Nevill (1923–1982) Christopher Nevill, 6th Marquess of Abergavenny (b. 1955)Hon. Ralph Pelham Nevill (1832–1914)
Percy Llewelyn Nevill (1877–1927)
Michael George Ralph Nevill (1917–1943)
(1). David Michael Ralph Nevill (b. 1941)
(2). Guy Michael Rossmore Nevill  (b. 1973)
(3). George David Roland Nevill (b. 2010)
(4). Frederick Guy James Nevill  (b. 2012)
(5). Ralph William James Nevill (b. 2015)
(6). Michael George Rathmore Nevill (b. 1943)

See also
Abergavenny Museum
Baron Bergavenny
House of Neville
Eridge Park

References

Sources
 Alt URL

Marquessates in the Peerage of the United Kingdom
Noble titles created in 1876
Abergavenny, Marquess of
Marquess